"Neon Knights" is a song by English rock band Black Sabbath from 1980's Heaven and Hell, their first album with American vocalist Ronnie James Dio.

Overview
"Neon Knights" was the last song written by the band for the Heaven and Hell album. It was quickly written and recorded at Studio Ferber in Paris during January 1980 simply to fill time on the album's first side. The lyrics were written by Ronnie James Dio. It is the only song on Heaven and Hell to definitely feature songwriting input from bassist Geezer Butler, the band's main lyricist during the Ozzy Osbourne era. Butler was absent for most of the songwriting process due personal issues as well as his own uncertainty as to whether he wanted to remain in the band. Dio occasionally performed the song during their live shows. The venue and date of the live version of "Children of the Sea" is not specified. The song reached number 22 on the UK charts, but failed to chart in the US or anywhere else.

In the UK the first 25,000 copies had a picture-bag.

Track listing
7" single
 "Neon Knights" – 3:49
 "Children of the Sea" (live) – 6:30

Personnel
Tony Iommi – guitar
Bill Ward – drums
Geezer Butler – bass
Ronnie James Dio – vocals
Geoff Nicholls – keyboards

Chart positions

Covers

 Iron Savior covered the song on their 1999 album Unification.
 Steel Prophet covered the song on their 2000 album Genesis.
 Turbo covered the song on their 2001 album Awatar.
 Westworld covered the song on their 2002 album Cyberdreams.
 Queensrÿche covered the song on their 2007 album Take Cover.
 Sapattivuosi covered the song on their 2009 album Ihmisen merkki.
 Warrior covered the song in 2010 for the tribute album Neon Knights – A Tribute to Black Sabbath.
 Anthrax covered the song during live performances in tribute to Dio following his death in 2010. In 2014, the band recorded a studio version for the tribute album Ronnie James Dio – This Is Your Life.

References

1980 singles
Black Sabbath songs
Songs written by Tony Iommi
Songs written by Geezer Butler
Songs written by Bill Ward (musician)
Songs written by Ronnie James Dio
1980 songs
Vertigo Records singles
Warner Records singles